The Hillside World Academy (formerly the Chinese International School) is a K–12 international school running the International Baccalaureate (IB) curriculum from Nursery to Grade 12 levels. The Primary Years Programme, the Middle Years Programme and the Diploma Programme are all represented in the school.

Address
The school was previously sited at 60 Dunearn Road, when it was the Chinese International School, from 2006 to 2015. It moved to its present location at 11 Hillside Drive in 2015 and was renamed the Hillside World Academy.

History
The management of Huijia Private School (Beijing) was invited by the Economic Development Board (EDB) in the mid-2000s to found a Chinese international school catering to the needs of the Chinese expatriates in Singapore. In October 2006, the school was established at a former public-school grounds in Dunearn Road.

Principals
2006-2006: Unknown (Singapore)
2006-2007: Unknown (Westerner)
2007-2011: Mr Shi (PRC)
2011-2013: Mdm Zhong (PRC)
2013-2016: Mr Stephen Keagan (Australia)
2016-2016: Mr Seah Poh Choo (Singapore)
2016-2017: Mr Michael Chan (Singapore)
2017-2018: Ms Clarissa Lim (Singapore)
2018-Current: Mr Shi (PRC)

Education
The school runs the International Baccalaureate (IB) programme.

The Primary Years Programme has the distinction of being taught about 50% in English and 50% in Chinese, making the school the only one among the FSSs in Singapore to be "truly bilingual". The school has won many awards and recognition for the quality of its Chinese education, making it a popular school for western expatriates desiring a strong Chinese foundation for their children.

The school runs a CCA programme with an emphasis on Chinese culture.

References

External links
Official website

Schools in Hougang
International Baccalaureate schools in Singapore